Kent was a federal electoral district (riding) represented in the House of Commons of Canada from 1867 to 1904, 1917 to 1968, and 1979 to 1997. It was located in the province of Ontario, and was created by the British North America Act of 1867.

Geographic history
Kent initially consisted of the Townships of Chatham, Dover, East Tilbury, Romney, Raleigh, and Harwich, and the Town of Chatham. In 1882, the township of Chatham was excluded from the riding, and the village of Blenheim was added.

The electoral district was abolished in 1903 when it was redistributed between Kent East and Kent West ridings.

The electoral district of Kent was recreated from Kent West and Kent East in 1914, and consisted of the county of Kent, excluding the townships of Zone and Camden.

In 1924, it was redefined as consisting of the part of the county of Kent lying west or south of and including the Gore of Chatham, the township of Chatham and the river Thames, but excluding the town of Tilbury and the village of Wheatley.

In 1933, it was redefined as consisting of the county of Kent, excluding the townships of Camden, Gore of Camden, Gore of Chatham and Zone, and including the city of Chatham, the town of Tilbury and the village of Wheatley.

In 1947, it was redefined as consisting of the county of Kent, excluding the townships of Camden and Zone, and that part of the township of Chatham formerly known as the Gore of Chatham; but including the city of Chatham, the town of Tilbury and the village of Wheatley.

The electoral district was abolished in 1966 when it was redistributed between Kent—Essex and Lambton—Kent ridings.

The electoral district of Kent was recreated a second time from Kent—Essex and Lambton—Kent ridings 1976. It consisted of:

(a) the part of the County of Kent lying north and east and including the Township of Dover, the City of Chatham, the Township of Chatham and the Township of Howard to the shore of Lake Erie, and

(b) Indian Reserve No. 46 in the County of Lambton.

In 1987, it was redefined to consist of

(a) the part of the County of Kent lying north and east of and including the Township of Howard, the Township of Chatham, the City of Chatham, and the Township of Dover, and

(b) that part of the County of Lambton contained in Walpole Island Indian Reserve No. 46.

The electoral district was abolished in 1996 when it was redistributed between Kent—Essex and Lambton—Kent—Middlesex ridings.

Members of Parliament

This riding has elected the following Members of Parliament:

Election results

Kent, 1867–1904

|}

|}

|}

|}

|}

On the election being declared void, 31 December 1883:

|}

|}

On Mr. Campbell being unseated, 17 November 1887:

|}

|}

|}

|}

Kent, 1917–1968

|}

|}

On Mr. McCoig being called to the Senate, 4 January 1922:

|}

|}

|}

|}

|}

On Mr. Rutherford's death, 27 February 1939:

|}

|}

|}

|}

|}

|}

|}

|}

|}

|}

Kent, 1979–1997

|}

|}

|}

|}

|}

See also 

 List of Canadian federal electoral districts
 Past Canadian electoral districts

External links 
Riding history 1867 to 1904 from the Library of Parliament
Riding history 1917 to 1968 from the Library of Parliament
Riding history 1979 to 1997 from the Library of Parliament

Former federal electoral districts of Ontario